The Samsung Experience Store is a chain of retail stores featuring products by Samsung Electronics. Unlike other Samsung-branded stores, these stores are generally owned and operated by Samsung Electronics themselves, specifically their local distribution arms. Locations primarily sell Samsung Galaxy mobile devices and accessories and can feature other Samsung-owned brands.

Overview

Samsung Experience Stores, previously called Galaxy Stores in some regions, are branded retail stores run by Samsung Electronics throughout the world. While all stores include products from Samsung Electronics' mobile devices, particularly those using the Samsung Galaxy brand, some stores additionally feature other Samsung-owned brands, including SmartThings smart devices, Harman audio products, Samsung TVs, and Samsung home appliances.

Other stores
Other Samsung-branded stores exist in multiple countries, including countries with Samsung Experience Stores. These are generally not official, Samsung-operated locations. Exceptions to this are Samsung's domestic market, South Korea, and the Baltics in Europe, where the company runs its retail locations without sharing the Samsung Experience Store brand.

In Samsung's domestic market of South Korea, there are various service stores throughout the country with showcases of different Samsung products available for purchase and also have repair centers for those items. There are also stores dedicated to the installation of large household appliances such as TVs, dishwashers, and refrigerators, and stores just for the sale and repair of its memory products, such as SSDs. None of Samsung's stores in South Korea use the Samsung Experience Store branding. 

In Estonia, Latvia, and Lithuania, Samsung Electronics runs official retail locations that currently do not feature the Samsung Experience Store name and are instead called Samsung Stores.

Pop-up shops and kiosks 
In addition to Samsung Experience Store locations, Samsung runs pop-up shops in some regions. In the United States, these are branded Samsung Experience Shops located inside Best Buy stores. In New Zealand, pop-up shops are branded Samsung Pop-up Experiences, while longer-lasting kiosk locations are branded Samsung Studios.

Locations

Samsung Experience Stores are present in over 60 countries across 6 continents.

Bulgaria 

The first Samsung Experience Store in Bulgaria opened in February 2021 in Sofia, the country's capital, located within The Mall. As of 2023, it operates three stores, all located in Sofia, with their latest location offering television sets and home appliances by Samsung as well.

Canada 

Samsung has seven Samsung Experience Stores in Canada, four of which are in Toronto. 

The flagship store is located within the Toronto Eaton Centre and has two levels spanning 21,000 square feet. Unlike other locations which only sell mobile devices, it features the entire Samsung product portfolio. On the first floor there are phones, tablets, smartwatches, other electronics, and accessories on display. There is also a Virtual Reality section where you can play VR games and sit in a chair to watch videos in VR, such as riding a roller coaster. On the second floor, there is a housewares section where Samsung fridges, stoves, and appliances are shown. The TV section shows off their big-screen TVs. There is also a section for warranty and repairs. 

The other three Toronto locations are located in Scarborough Town Centre, Sherway Gardens, and Yorkdale Shopping Centre. Samsung's three other Samsung Experience Stores in Canada outside of Toronto are located in Edmonton's West Edmonton Mall, Vancouver's Metropolis at Metrotown, and Montreal's Montreal Eaton Center.

India
Samsung opened its second largest store and all products experience center in the world in Bangalore, Karnataka covering an area of 33,000 sq ft, under the name Samsung Opera House. The company additionally runs multiple other Samsung Experience Stores throughout the country, mostly under the Samsung SmartCafé sub-brand.

United States 
Samsung opened its flagship store in the company's New York headquarters in the Meatpacking District on February 22, 2016. Dubbed Samsung 837 after its street address, 837 Washington Street, this store does not sell any Samsung products. Instead it's envisioned as a “marketing center” according to Gregory Lee, President and CEO of Samsung Electronics America, designed to showcase Samsung's future concepts and technologies to the public.
The first Samsung-run U.S. retail locations opened on February 20, 2019 in Garden City, N.Y., Houston and Los Angeles as part of the company's celebration of the Galaxy product line's ten year anniversary. As of 2022, Samsung has five Samsung Experience Stores in the United States. They are located in Houston's The Galleria, Los Angeles' Americana at Brand, Garden City's Roosevelt Field, Palo Alto's Stanford Shopping Center, and Dallas' Stonebriar Centre.

See also 
 Apple Store
 Google Store
 Microsoft Store

References 

South Korean brands
Samsung Electronics
Consumer electronics retailers
Consumer electronics retailers in the United States